Aleeza Yu (born ) is a Canadian artistic gymnast.

Biography
She was born in Markham, Ontario, Canada, to Gordon Yu and Sheree Wong. Her family, which is of Chinese origin, practices Falun Dafa, a traditional meditation and spiritual practice. In 2014 she finished second in all-round in the Elite Canada, with an all-around score of 55.650 points. In 2016 she was awarded a full athletic scholarship at Stanford University. In February 2017 she recorded the second highest score in Stanford's 195.775-195.200 victory over Arizona State. In January 2019 she scored the third highest vault score in the Cardinal's home opener against UCLA.

References

1998 births
Living people
Canadian female artistic gymnasts